A kartouwe (plural: kartouwen) is a siege gun used in European warfare during the 16th and 17th centuries. The name kartouwe is of Dutch origin, a corruption of Latin quartana (quarter cannon). In the Holy Roman Empire the gun was called Kartaune in German or cartouwe in contemporary Latin, in the Swedish Empire Kartow, spelling variants include kartouw, kartouve,  cartow, cartaun, courtaun, and others.

Characteristics

Kartouwen were developed from bombards. As a minimum, twenty horses or oxen were needed to move a kartouwe.

In addition to "whole" ("hele") kartouwen, there were also double, half ("halve") and quarter kartouwen.

The huge size of the cannon and the weight of its 48-pound projectiles (standard value, though real projectiles could vary from 30 to 60 pounds) made it onerous to maneuver and reload. William P. Guthrie estimates that a single kartouwe averaged only 8 to 10 shots under sustained combat conditions, half to a third as much as the more common 3 to 6 pounder field guns, though in all cases "well-drilled troops could shave these times."

Use and perception

Kartouwen were used for example in the Livonian War by the Russian and Swedish forces. During the Battle of Narva (1581), the besieging Swedish forces destroyed the walls of Narva,  strong, within two days using twenty-four double and half-kartouwen.

Kartouwen were also the characteristic of the Thirty Years' War. As such, they were featured in contemporary poems, e.g. in Am liebsten bey der Liebsten by Sibylla Schwarz ("grausame Kartaune", "gruesome kartouwe"). In his 1844 poem Die Tendenz, Heinrich Heine used kartouwen to symbolize loudness.

Sources

References

Bibliography

Siege artillery